The Kupal oil field is an oil field located in Khuzestan Province, at 60 km east of Ahvaz City. It was discovered in 1965 and the production was started after installing production facilities in 1970. The total proven reserves of the Kupal oil field are around 5,6 billion barrels. The field has 60 km in length 1.5 km in width and includes two Asmari and Bangestan reservoirs. So far, 55 wells were drilled in this field, 39 wells are active, which produce totally . The field is owned by state-owned National Iranian Oil Company (NIOC) and operated by National Iranian South Oil Company (NISOC).

See also

List of oil fields

References

Oil fields of Iran